Clavatula knudseni is a species of sea snail, a marine gastropod mollusc in the family Clavatulidae.

Distribution
This species occurs in the Atlantic Ocean off West Africa (Senegal, Gambia and Ivory Coast).

References

External links
 World Registry of Marine Species - Clavatula Knudseni

knudseni
Gastropods described in 2007